Lieutenant-Colonel Sir George Montgomerie John Moore   (22 November 1844 – 5 April 1911) was a British army officer and administrator who served as President of the Corporation of Madras from 1886 to 1902. Moore is remembered for the  creation of Moore Market which was later named after him.

Moore was born in British India, the son of Capt. Thomas Palmer Moore and his wife, Janet. He was baptised in Berhampore, Madras.

Moore was District Grand Master for Madras in the Masonic United Grand Lodge of England.

References 

1844 births
1911 deaths
Royal Artillery officers
Companions of the Order of the Indian Empire
Knights Bachelor